Elizabeth Minter (born 23 August 1965) is an Australian former professional tennis player. She was born on 23 August 1965 in Australia and played on the WTA tour from 1980 to 1990. She now helps train young children.

Tennis career
In 1983 Minter won the 1983 US Open Junior Girls' Singles. She reached the quarterfinals of the Australian Women's Doubles with her sister Anne Minter in 1984 losing to Chris Evert and Wendy Turnbull; the third round of Wimbledon in 1986 and 1988; and the U.S. Open in 1986. She retired with a 72–80 singles record and a 32–67 doubles record. In 1984 Minter won the Salt Lake City ITF Doubles title, with her sister.

Minter made her Fed Cup debut for Australia in 1984, where she played two doubles matches with her sister, against Argentina in the first round and Belgium in the second round of the World Group. Minter didn't make any further appearances for Australia.

WTA Tour finals

Singles 1

Doubles 3 (2–1)

Career finals

Singles (3–2)

Doubles (3–1)

References

External links
 
 
 

1965 births
Living people
Australian female tennis players
Tennis people from Victoria (Australia)
US Open (tennis) junior champions
Grand Slam (tennis) champions in girls' singles
20th-century Australian women